Authentik is a R&B, hip hop and soul French album, written and performed by French-Algerian singer Kenza Farah. The album, her debut studio album contains 18 tracks (including two on the reissue) and guest appearances with Sefyu, Le Rat Luciano, Idir, Big Ali and The Silence of the Mosques. It was released June 11, 2007 in France. Authentik has been certified gold in France.

Track listing 
"Dans mon monde"
"Je me bats"
"Moi j'ai 20 ans"
"Ou va le monde"
"Lettre du front" feat. Sefyu
"Il m'a trahie"
"Dans les rues de ma ville"
"Trop d'flow" feat. Big Ali
"Mi amor"
"Ne me dites pas"
"Appelez moi Kenza"
"Sur tous les chemins" feat. Le Rat Luciano
"Sous le ciel de Marseille" feat. Idir
"Toi et moi"
"Cris de Bosnie" feat. Le Silence des Mosquées
"Les enfants du ghetto"
"Bye Bye"
"Leve la tête""

Authentik Mixtape

Track listing 
"Intro Dj Roc j"
"15éme Hardcore" feat G.a.p/Soosol
"Faut il que je sois?"
"Freestyle Skyrock"
"Trésor"
"Terre à terre" feat Kamelancien
"Je reprends mes ailes"
"Quoi qu'il arrive" feat Tino/Section fidjo
"L'Amour ou la Passion"
"Tu reconnais" feat Kayline & Moh/S.krim
"Plus rien sans toi' feat T-north
"On vous aime tant" feat Alonzo & Ligne 26 & Sale équipe
"Freestyle Skyrock"
"Il m'a trahie" + Medley ("L'Amour s'en va", "D'Amour ou d'amitié..")
"Seule sans toi"
"Nos différences"
"Face à la mort" feat Bouda/15eme Processus
"Flashback" feat K-RhYme le roi
"À la place d'un ange" feat Monock/La Méthode
"Toi et moi" feat Mickey-lansky)

Charts 
Authentik

Authetik Mixtape

References 

2007 debut albums
French-language albums
Kenza Farah albums